Sat Pal Mittal (1931 – 
1992) was an Indian politician from Punjab. He was a councillor of municipal corporation. He was a member of the Punjab Legislative Council (1964–70) and a Deputy Minister in the Government of Punjab. He was elected as a member of the Rajya Sabha for two terms from 1976 to 1982 and again from 1982 to 1988. He was nominated as a member of the same house in 1988 and served till 1992. Mittal was a member of the Indian National Congress and served as the Secretary of Punjab Pradesh Congress Committee in 1972. 

His son Sunil Mittal is chief executive of Bharti Enterprises.

Sources

Brief Biodata

Nominated members of the Rajya Sabha
Indian National Congress politicians
Rajya Sabha members from Punjab, India
1931 births
1992 deaths
Indian municipal councillors
Bharti Enterprises
Indian National Congress politicians from Punjab, India